Voltron is an animated television franchise.

Notable elements of the franchise include:
Beast King GoLion — the original Japanese version of the aforementioned show's first season.
Armored Fleet Dairugger XV - the original Japanese version of the second season.
Voltron (1984 TV series) — a 1980s anime television show.
Voltron: Fleet of Doom — a 1986 television movie.
Voltron: The Third Dimension — a 1998 television continuation of the 1980s show.
Voltron Force — a 2010 update of the original 1980s show.
Voltron: Legendary Defender  — a 2016 Netflix exclusive series.

Voltron